Rod Black is a Canadian country rock singer-songwriter and the lead singer of hard rock band Jet Black Stare. In 2014, Black launched a solo career with the release of the single "Keepin' On" to country radio. It peaked at number 22 on the Billboard Canada Country chart. Black was nominated at the 2015 Canadian Radio Music Awards for Best New Group or Solo Artist: Country for the song. Black's second solo single, "Long Gone", was released in March 2015. A music video for the song premiered in May. At the 2015 British Columbia Country Music Association Awards, Black was nominated for Rising Star.

Discography

Singles

Music videos

References

External links

Canadian country rock musicians
Canadian country singer-songwriters
Canadian male singer-songwriters
Living people
21st-century Canadian male singers
Year of birth missing (living people)